Dikaios is a former municipality on the island of Kos, in the Dodecanese, Greece. Since the 2011 local government reform it is part of the municipality Kos, of which it is a municipal unit. Population 7,130 (2011). The seat of the municipality was in Zipari (pop. 3,227). The other large town is Pyli (pop. 2,469). The municipal unit, which comprises about one-fifth of the island's territory, has a land area of 62.575 km². It shares the island of Kos with the municipal units of Kos and Irakleides.

References

Kos
Populated places in Kos (regional unit)